Rosemary Altea (born Rosemary Edwards) is a British author who describes herself as a medium and healer. She has appeared on various programs, including Larry King Live, The Oprah Winfrey Show, and featured in the series premiere of Penn & Teller: Bullshit! alongside mentalist Mark Edward. She has written six books and claims to have a "healing foundation".

Early life
Altea was born Rosemary Edwards in Leicester, England to Lilian and William Edwards, and has two brothers and three sisters. Rosemary claims to have had psychic visions from a young age, causing parents to threaten to commit her to a mental asylum. Her formal education ended at the age of 16 when she left school and then got married when she was 19. She has one daughter born in 1970. She divorced and fell upon financial hardship at age 35.

Career

In November 1981, Rosemary claims to have had a vision at night, after which she felt open to the possibility of a spirit world. The same year, struggling to make ends meet and take care of her daughter, she began charging £3.50 per session for psychic reading and adopted the name Rosemary Altea.

In 2001 Altea inherited a farm in Dorset, Vermont from Llewella Day, an elderly cancer victim.  Ms. Day changed her will shortly before she died, thereby cutting her family out and leaving the $740,000 farm to Altea, with the desire it remain a working farm. Altea successfully fought Day's family's attempts to invalidate the will, and—against Ms. Day's wishes—demolished the farm house to make the farm into "a healing foundation".

On 26 January 2007 Altea appeared on Larry King Live with skeptic James Randi. When asked on the show to take the One Million Dollar Paranormal Challenge, she argued that she "[doesn't] believe there's $1 million".

In 2009, Altea learned that her bookkeeper, Denise M. Hall, had stolen $200,000 from her over a period of seven years, using four credit cards to obtain cash advances, forging cheques and giving herself unauthorised electronic paychecks all under Altea's name.

Reception

Altea was featured on Penn & Teller: Bullshit! in the show's premiere episode, "Talking to the Dead."  Kevin Christopher of the Skeptical Inquirer wrote that the segment on Altea "was a nice expose of Rosemary Altea during a taped reading arranged by Showtime. Viewers got a clear picture of how she worked the small group of people present for readings prior to the taping in order to glean information for later use. Skeptic and mentalist Mark Edward replicated the cold reading tactics she used and showed how her publicist, Joni Evans, seeded the group with people whose biographies were already known to Altea in order to boost her on-camera success." Critics describe Altea as a clear example of hot reading.

Investigator Joe Nickell believes modern day self-proclaimed mediums like Altea are avoiding the Victorian tradition of dark rooms, spirit handwriting and flying tambourines as these methods risk exposure. They instead use "mental mediumship" tactics like cold reading or gleaning information from sitters beforehand. Group readings also improve hits by making general statements with conviction, which will fit at least one person in the audience.

Skeptic and author Michael Shermer concludes in Why People Believe Weird Things Altea learned cold reading by trial and error, and honestly  misattributes her success to psychic ability rather than deliberate deception. However, Shermer also alleges that during his appearance alongside Altea on The Oprah Winfrey Show in 1995, Altea used information obtained about a guest through an earlier discussion in a limo ride to the studio, an example of hot reading.

Bibliography
 Altea, Rosemary; Altea, Samantha Jane (2015) Angels in Training An Inspirational Guide for Everyday Life self-published through Lulu.com
 Altea, Rosemary (2007). A Matter of Life and Death: Remarkable True Stories of Hope and Healing. Jeremy P. Tarcher 
 Altea, Rosemary (2004). Soul Signs: An Elemental Guide to Your Spiritual Destiny. Rodale Press 
 Altea, Rosemary (2004). Give the Gift of Healing: A Concise Guide to Spiritual Healing. William Morrow & Company 
 Altea, Rosemary (2000). You Own the Power: Stories & Exercises To Inspire & Unleash The Force Within. William Morrow 
 Altea, Rosemary (1997). Proud Spirit: Lessons, Insights and Healing Stories. William Morrow 
 Altea, Rosemary (1995). The Eagle and The Rose: A Remarkable True Story. Warner Books

See also

References

External links

 Rosemary Altea – Official website
 

Transcripts
 Larry King Live: Rosemary Altea Discusses `You Own the Power' 15 March 2000
 Larry King Live: Spiritual Medium Versus Paranormal Skeptic (Altea verses James Randi) 5 June 2001
 Larry King Live: Interview With Rosemary Altea 13 December 2002
 Larry King Live: Have Psychics Gone Too Far? 26 January 2007 (Altea and James Randi)

English psychics
English spiritual mediums
Living people
Year of birth missing (living people)
People from Leicester